George Walpole, 3rd Earl of Orford (2 April 1730 – 5 December 1791) was a British administrator, politician, and peer.

Life
Lord Orford was the only child of the 2nd Earl of Orford and his wife Margaret Rolle, Baroness Clinton in her own right. His parents separated shortly after his birth. His father's mistress, Hannah Norsa, a celebrated singer and actress at Covent Garden, took up residence at Houghton Hall from 1736 until his father's death. Orford's mother married again in 1751 and was buried at Leghorn (Livorno) in 1781, "a woman of very singular character and considered half mad".

Resident at Houghton Hall in Norfolk, between 1751 and 1791 he served as High Steward of King's Lynn, recently but by then no longer the nation's third most important port because of the expansion of transatlantic trade from the west coast, and also High Steward of Yarmouth, then a major fishing port.

He was Lord Lieutenant of Norfolk from 1757 and was appointed Colonel of the Norfolk Militia in 1759.  He also served as a Lord of the Bedchamber to King George II until the latter's death, and then to King George III until 1782.

On his father's death, 31 March 1751, he succeeded as 3rd Earl of Orford. On the death of his mother in 1781 he became the sixteenth Baron Clinton.

An intended marriage to an heiress, Margaret Nicoll was disrupted by his uncle Lord Walpole of Wolterton. Instead, Margaret married the Duke of Chandos.

Orford was a celebrated falconer. He also enjoyed hare coursing and founded Swaffham Coursing Club in 1776, initially with twenty-six members, each naming their greyhounds after a different alphabet letter. For some years it was the leading coursing club in England, holding several meetings a year. He also organised coursing for neighbouring farmers and provided prizes. He became extravagant (his father died probably bankrupt) and increasingly eccentric and eventually died insane.  He left no legitimate heirs, having never married, and at his death, aged 61, his titles – except the title of Baron Clinton, which due to its great antiquity had the peculiarity of being able to descend through the female line and passed into the Trefusis family, descendants of Walpole's great-aunt Bridget Rolle (1648–1721) – were passed to his uncle, Horace Walpole, who also took the still heavily encumbered Houghton estate. Walpole is buried in the Church of St Martin at Tours on the Houghton Hall estate.

There is documentary evidence that he had an illegitimate daughter, named Georgina Walpole, whose mother was Mary Sparrow of Eriswell.

Gross mismanagement and extravagance

Orford is particularly remembered for his 1778 sale of his grandfather Robert Walpole's magnificent Walpole collection of art to Catherine the Great. It now forms part of the core of the collection at the Hermitage Museum in St Petersburg.

Orford intended his sale of the pictures to have taken place in secrecy but his plan soon leaked out and became of intense interest to the public. The trustees of the British Museum petitioned parliament for their purchase and the erection of a new building in the grounds of the British Museum. The eventual sale to the Empress of Russia was regarded as a national calamity.

A collection of 204 paintings were received in St Petersburg. Some were sold, mostly during the 1930s, and 126 pictures now remain at The Hermitage.

See also
Robert Walpole, 2nd Earl of Orford
Horace Walpole, 4th Earl of Orford
Earl of Orford
Baron Walpole

References

Further reading
Murdoch, Tessa (ed.), Noble Households: Eighteenth-Century Inventories of Great English Houses (Cambridge, John Adamson, 2006)  . For an inventory and valuation of the goods and chattels at Houghton Hall belonging to the earl taken in June 1792 following the earl's death in December 1791, see pp. 185–205.

External links
The Peerage.Com

1730 births
1791 deaths
Earls in the Peerage of Great Britain
Lord-Lieutenants of Norfolk
George
Barons Clinton
People from Houghton, Norfolk
Earls of Orford